Aed Ó Finn was a 13th century Irish musician. His obituary, sub anno 1269, records that he was a "master of music and minstrelsy".

References

External links
 
 http://www.ucc.ie/celt/published/T100005D/index.html 

Year of birth unknown
1269 deaths
Medieval Gaels from Ireland
Medieval Irish musicians
13th-century Irish people